THI and E Interurban Depot-Substation, also known as Plainfield Interurban Depot, is a historic interurban train station located at Plainfield, Hendricks County, Indiana.

Design
The building consisted of a small brick passenger  / cargo depot in the front facing the street and track plus a large, two-story repair facility and power conversion AC to DC substation at the rear. Holes in the upper part of the substation walls are where electrical transmission wires entered and left.  It has Italianate style design elements in the round arched window openings. The passenger depot section is topped by a series of red clay tile hipped roofs.

The structure is of the same design as the Amo Depot.

History
The station was built in 1907 by the Terre Haute, Indianapolis and Eastern Traction Company. Interurban transportation for Plainfield ceased on January 10, 1940.

The building was subsequently used as an American Legion post. It was added to the National Register of Historic Places in 2002.

See also
Amo THI & E Interurban Depot/Substation

References

Railway stations on the National Register of Historic Places in Indiana
Italianate architecture in Indiana
Railway stations in the United States opened in 1907
National Register of Historic Places in Hendricks County, Indiana
Transportation buildings and structures in Hendricks County, Indiana
1907 establishments in Indiana
Former railway stations in Indiana